The Annie Awards are accolades which the Los Angeles branch of the International Animated Film Association, ASIFA-Hollywood, has presented each year since 1972 to recognize excellence in animation shown in cinema and television. Originally designed to celebrate lifetime or career contributions to animation, the award has been given to individual works since 1992.

Membership in ASIFA-Hollywood is divided into three main categories: General Member (for professionals), Patron (for enthusiasts of animation), and Student Member. Members in each category pay a fee to belong to the branch. Selected professional members of the branch are permitted to vote to decide the awards.

The 48th and 49th Annie Awards ceremonies were held virtually on April 16, 2021, and March 12, 2022, respectively, due to the ongoing COVID-19 pandemic.

History 
In 1972, June Foray first conceived the idea of awards for excellence in the field of animation. With the approval of ASIFA-Hollywood president Nick Bosustow, an Annie Award ceremony was organized. The first ceremony was held at the banquet room of Sportsmen's Lodge in Ventura Boulevard in Studio City, Los Angeles, California. Max Fleischer and Dave Fleischer were the first to be honored by the first Annie Awards for creating Betty Boop, bringing Popeye, and Olive Oyl to the animated screen, and for inventing the technique of rotoscoping.

Naming "Annie Awards" 
According to Foray, her husband Hobart Donavan suggested that the awards be called "Annie", because they are presented for excellence in animation.

Trophy 
The first trophy for the Annie Award trophy was presented in the second award ceremony, to Walter Lantz, the founder of Walter Lantz Productions and creator of Woody Woodpecker. Made of wood and plastic, it was shaped like a zoetrope. The next year, Tom Woodward designed the trophy now presented.

Award categories

Current categories
As of 2022, 37 categories are presented including for film and television productions.

Production
 Best Animated Feature
 Best Animated Feature — Independent
 Best Animated Special Production
 Best Animated Short Subject
 Best Animated Sponsored Production
 Best General Audience Animated Television Production
 Best TV Production for Children
 Best TV Production for Preschool Children
 Best Student Film
 Best TV/Media – Limited Series

Individual achievement in Film
 Outstanding Animated Effects
 Outstanding Character Animation - Animation
 Outstanding Character Animation - Live Action
 Outstanding Character Design
 Outstanding Directing
 Outstanding Editorial
 Outstanding Music
 Outstanding Production Design
 Outstanding Storyboarding
 Outstanding Voice Acting
 Outstanding Writing

Individual achievement in Television, Broadcast and Video Game
 Outstanding Animated Effects
 Outstanding Character Animation - TV/Media
 Outstanding Character Animation - Video Game
 Outstanding Character Design
 Outstanding Directing
 Outstanding Editorial
 Outstanding Music
 Outstanding Production Design
 Outstanding Storyboarding
 Outstanding Voice Acting
 Outstanding Writing

Juried awards
 June Foray Award
 Ub Iwerks Award
 Winsor McCay Award
 Special Achievement in Animation
 Certificates of Merit

Defunct categories
 Best Animated Home Entertainment Production
 Best Virtual Reality Production
 Outstanding Animated Effects - Live Action

Balloting controversies and criticism

2008 Best Short Subject mixup
In 2008, the Annie Award nominees for Best Short Subject included two Walt Disney cartoons, a Pixar short, and two independent films: Picnic Pictures' The Chestnut Tree, and Don Hertzfeldt's short Everything Will Be OK. Official rules for the Annie Awards state that voting members must view all nominated achievements in their entirety before casting their ballot for a winner. Members are directed to view the nominated films on a secure website.

When the online ballot launched on January 15, the two independent films were not included for voters to judge. ASIFA acknowledged this error over a week later, at which point all the votes were reportedly thrown out and the balloting system was reset. Voters were instructed to return and re-vote the category. "The Chestnut Tree" was now uploaded properly to the ballot; however, Everything Will Be OK was again not included: this time, the online ballot only played a portion of this film's 17-minute running time to voters, abruptly cutting out in the middle of a scene. ASIFA again took several days to repair the ballot, but this time allowed voting to continue.

By the time the ballot officially closed on February 1, Everything Will Be OK was only available to voters for less than 24 hours of the entire 18-day voting period. Even though ASIFA apologized to Hertzfeldt, they took no further action and carried on with the event, awarding the prize to the Pixar short, Your Friend the Rat. (Hertzfeldt would eventually win the award for his 2015 Oscar-nominated short film World of Tomorrow.)

Kung Fu Panda upset and Disney boycott
In 2009, DreamWorks Animation's Kung Fu Panda swept the Annie Awards in a surprise upset over Pixar's WALL-E, which won no Annie Awards but did go on to win the Academy Award for Best Animated Feature. Many felt that the vote had been rigged: DreamWorks at the time gave each of their employees a free membership to ASIFA-Hollywood, which in turn conferred voting rights. (For most film awards, voting rights cannot be bought but must be conferred by one's peers.)

As a result, Walt Disney Studios decided to cease submissions and support for the 2010 Annie Awards from their two animated film divisions, Walt Disney Animation Studios and Pixar. Due to Disney's complaints, ASIFA-Hollywood changed the rules on voting for individual achievement categories, making those categories only available to professionals within those categories. ASIFA-Hollywood head Antran Manoogian also said that Annie voters would in the future have to be approved by a committee and non-professionals would now be ineligible to vote.

That was not enough for Disney president Ed Catmull, who had called for an advisory committee of relevant executives representing each studio to recommend rule changes to the ASIFA board. Catmull said, "We believe there is an issue with the way the Annies are judged, and have been seeking a mutually agreeable solution with the board. Although some initial steps have been taken, the board informed us that no further changes would be made to address our concerns." ASIFA-Hollywood did not agree to this demand.

Disney and Pixar rejoined the Annie Awards in 2011, with no formal announcement. Ironically, earlier that year, the Annie Awards had a near-exact replay of the 2009 results, with DreamWorks Animation's How to Train Your Dragon sweeping all the major Annie Awards over Pixar's Toy Story 3, which went on to win the Academy Award for Best Animated Feature and also received a nomination for Best Picture.

Notable nominations

Film 

The following nominees (motion pictures and direct-to-video films) received multiple nominations:

The following winners (motion pictures and direct-to-video films) received multiple awards:

TV 

The following nominees (TV shows, specials, and special presentations) received multiple  wins and nominations:

The following winners (TV shows, specials, and special presentations) received multiple awards:

See also 

 List of animation awards
 List of Annie Awards ceremonies
 International Animated Film Association

References

External links

 Annie Awards official site. Archived from the original on July 12, 2015.

 
American animation awards
Career awards
International Animated Film Association
Recurring events established in 1972
History of animation